The twelfth season of British science fiction television series Doctor Who began on 28 December 1974 with Tom Baker's first serial Robot, and ended with Revenge of the Cybermen on 10 May 1975.

This is the first season to feature Tom Baker as the fourth incarnation of the Doctor, an alien Time Lord who travels through time and space in his TARDIS, which appears to be a British police box on the outside. He is accompanied by companions Sarah Jane Smith (Elisabeth Sladen), continuing from season eleven, and Harry Sullivan (Ian Marter), who joins in this season. With Barry Letts and Terrance Dicks having both departed along with Jon Pertwee, new producer Philip Hinchcliffe and new script editor Robert Holmes worked on this series. Holmes had previously written for the programme.

Casting

Main cast 
 Tom Baker as the Fourth Doctor
 Elisabeth Sladen as Sarah Jane Smith
 Ian Marter as Harry Sullivan

During production of season eleven, it was known that Jon Pertwee would be leaving his role as the Third Doctor and that a new Fourth Doctor would need to be cast for the part. Tom Baker was an out-of-work actor, working in construction at the time. Baker had been a television and film actor, having major parts in several films including The Vault of Horror (1973) and as the main antagonist in The Golden Voyage of Sinbad the same year. He had written to Bill Slater, the Head of Serials at the BBC, asking for work. Slater suggested Baker to Doctor Who producer Barry Letts who had been looking to fill the part. Letts had been the producer of the series since the early Pertwee serials in 1970. He had seen Baker's work in The Golden Voyage of Sinbad and hired him for the part. Baker would continue in his role as the Doctor for seven seasons, longer than any other actor to play the part.

Elisabeth Sladen returned to play the role of companion Sarah Jane Smith throughout the season. Ian Marter joined the cast as Harry Sullivan. The character was created before Baker was cast; there had been discussion of casting an older actor as the Doctor, and so Harry was created as a younger character to handle the action scenes.

Recurring cast
 Nicholas Courtney as Brigadier Lethbridge-Stewart
 John Levene as Warrant Officer Benton

Nicholas Courtney and John Levene reprised their roles as the Brigadier and Warrant Officer Benton respectively in the first serial, Robot. Courtney had begun his role in the Second Doctor story The Web of Fear (1968), where the character was a colonel. Levene had begun in Second Doctor story The Invasion (1968), replacing another actor. Both were members of the military organization United Nations Intelligence Taskforce (UNIT). They, along with Sladen, would be the transition cast to carry through from the Third Doctor to the Fourth Doctor, though Robot is the only UNIT story for the twelfth season.

Serials 

After Robot, all the serials in this season continue directly one after the other, tracing one single problematic voyage of the TARDIS crew. Despite the continuity, each serial is considered its own standalone story.

The season was initially formatted as the previous Pertwee season had been with three six-part stories and two four-part stories.  To this end, the initial structure was to open with the four-part Robot and the four-part Space Station by Christopher Langley followed by three six-parters – Genesis of Terror (later retitled Genesis of the Daleks), Loch Ness, and another six-part story to be determined.  Script editor Robert Holmes discussed with Philip Hinchcliffe the possibility of replacing the as-yet undecided six-parter with a four-part story and a two-parter, both with the same production team. The season structure later became two four-part stories (Robot and a replacement for Space Station, The Ark in Space), the new two-parter The Destructors (later retitled The Sontaran Experiment), the six-part Genesis of Terror, and a four-part version of Loch Ness (later retitled Terror of the Zygons and held over for season 13). This decision made The Sontaran Experiment the first two-part story since Season 2's The Rescue. It was also the first to be shot entirely on location since Jon Pertwee's opening story Spearhead from Space in Season 7, and the first to be shot entirely on videotape instead of 16mm film, as was usual for location shooting. As a means of saving money, The Ark in Space and Revenge of the Cybermen were shot on the same sets.

Production
Barry Letts served as producer for Robot, after which he was succeeded by Philip Hinchcliffe. Robert Holmes took over from Terrance Dicks as script editor.

Robot was written by Dicks, who cited King Kong as an influence for the serial. Dicks incorporated several familiar elements from the Third Doctor's first story Spearhead from Space (1970), which helped the audience transition between actors. The Ark in Space was written by Robert Holmes from a story by John Lucarotti that was considered unusable. Letts and Dicks were eager to have Terry Nation return to write the Daleks, but initially found his script too similar to past Dalek adventures. They suggested that he write a Dalek origin story instead, which became Genesis of the Daleks. However, under Hinchcliffe, the serial gained a darker tone.

The sets of The Ark in Space were reused for Revenge of the Cybermen. Genesis of the Daleks was the last serial of the season to be filmed, after Revenge of the Cybermen. This took place in January and February 1975.

Broadcast
The entire season was broadcast from 28 December 1974 to 10 May 1975.

The title sequence for Part One of The Ark in Space was tinted sepia as an experiment, but was not repeated for subsequent episodes.

Home media

VHS releases

Betamax releases

Video 2000 releases

Laserdisc releases

DVD and Blu-ray releases

In print

References

Bibliography

External links
 

1974 British television seasons
1975 British television seasons
Season 12
Season 12
12